1953 Albanian Cup was the seventh season of Albania's annual cup competition. It began in Spring 1953 with the First Round and ended in May 1953 with the Final match. Dinamo Tirana were the defending champions, having won their third Albanian Cup last season. The cup was won by Dinamo Tirana.

The rounds were played in a one-legged format similar to those of European competitions. If the number of goals was equal, the match was decided by extra time and a penalty shootout, if necessary.

First round
Games were played in March, 1953.

|}
+ Spartaku Tiranë won by draw.

Second round
Games were played in March, 1953*

|}

Quarter-finals
In this round entered the 8 winners from the previous round.

|}
+ Spartaku Tiranë won by draw.

Semi-finals
In this round entered the four winners from the previous round.

|}

Final

References

 Calcio Mondiale Web

External links
 Official website 

Cup
1953 domestic association football cups
1953